The Order of Saint Michael, later Order of Merit of Saint Michael was founded on September 29, 1693  by Joseph Clemens of Bavaria, then Archbishop-Elector of Cologne, as a military order. Its full name was Most Illustrious Military Order of Defenders of Divine Glory under the Protection of the Holy Archangel Michael. Initially, this order was only open to the Catholic nobility. Upon its institution, the order consisted of the Grand Master and three classes: Commander, Knight Officer and Knight, divided in two divisions, spiritual and secular. The Grand Master was bestowed with a Breast Star. The commanders, officially limited to nine of the spiritual and the secular division each, constituted the chapter. They also were known as Knights Grand Cross. The order had four spiritual officers: chancellor, honorary chaplain, almoner, and sacristan, and the same amount of secular officers: marshal, treasurer, equerry, and chamberlain. The third class was limited to 18 spiritual und secular knights each, so the order ideally should have had 63 members, representing the age of the queen of angels.

The headquarter on the order in the Electorate of Cologne was located in the Godesburg, later in the Electoral Palace. Its Bavarian main church was St. Michael in Berg am Laim, Munich.

In 1808, the order was recognized by Maximilian I Joseph of Bavaria and the grade of Knights of Honour, limited to twelve recipients, was added to the third class. In 1813, the order received the official title of the Knightly House Order of St. Michael.

On 16 February 1837, Ludwig I of Bavaria transformed the military order into an order of merit, called Order of Merit of St. Michael, divided into three classes: Knight Grand Cross, Commander, and Knight. The physical appearance of the decorations also changed at this time. In 1855, the classes of Knight Commander and Knight 2nd class were introduced. In 1887, according to a proposal of Crailsheim, the order got reformed and divided into Knights 1st, 2nd, 3rd and 4th class; a cross of merit and a silver medal were affiliated with the order.

List of Grandmasters 

 1693–1723: Joseph Clemens of Bavaria, Archbishop-Elector of Cologne
 1723–1761: Clemens August of Bavaria, Archbishop-Elector of Cologne and Grand Master of the Teutonic Order
 1761–1763: Johann Theodor of Bavaria, Prince-Bishop of Regensburg, Prince-Bishop of Freising, and Prince-Bishop of Liège.
 1763–1770: Duke Clement Francis of Bavaria
 1770–1777: Maximilian III Joseph, Elector of Bavaria
 1778–1795: Charles II August, Duke of Zweibrücken
 1795–1799: Maximilian Joseph, Duke of Zweibrücken
 1799–1837: Duke Wilhelm in Bavaria

After the death of Duke Wilhelm and the transformation into an order of merit, the King of Bavaria as the fount of honor was de facto Grand Master.

References

Orders, decorations, and medals of Bavaria
Electorate of Cologne
Awards established in 1693
Catholic ecclesiastical decorations
1693 establishments in the Holy Roman Empire
Michael (archangel)